Ri Song-Hui (born December 3, 1978) is a North Korean weightlifter who competed in the women's 58 kg at the 2000 Summer Olympics and won the silver medal with 220.0 kg in total.

She repeated this in the 2004 Summer Olympics, this time lifting a total of 232.5 kg.

With 102 kg she broke the world record in snatch in the women's 53 kg class.

Notes and references
olimpic games
2000 sidney
2004 athens

References

External links
profile
sports-reference

1978 births
Living people
North Korean female weightlifters
Olympic weightlifters of North Korea
Weightlifters at the 2000 Summer Olympics
Weightlifters at the 2004 Summer Olympics
Olympic silver medalists for North Korea
World record setters in weightlifting
Olympic medalists in weightlifting
Asian Games medalists in weightlifting
Weightlifters at the 1998 Asian Games
Weightlifters at the 2002 Asian Games
Medalists at the 2004 Summer Olympics
People's Athletes
Medalists at the 2000 Summer Olympics
Asian Games gold medalists for North Korea
Asian Games silver medalists for North Korea
Medalists at the 1998 Asian Games
Medalists at the 2002 Asian Games
World Weightlifting Championships medalists
21st-century North Korean women
20th-century North Korean women